Baghirua is a large village located in Bhogaon Tehsil of Mainpuri district in Uttar Pradesh, with a population of 437 families. It falls under Mainpuri Lok Sabha  and Kishni Vidhan Sabha constituency.

Demographics
Baghirua has a population of 2748: 1503 males and 1245 females according to the  Population Census 2011. There are 381 children from 0 to 6 years of age, which is 13.86% of the total population of the village. The Scheduled Castes (SC) constitute 4.15% of the population. Baghirua currently does not have any Scheduled Tribes (ST) population.

Gender Ratio
There are 828 females per 1000 males in Baghirua, lower than the Uttar Pradesh state average of 912.

Average Literacy
Baghirua has a higher overall literacy rate of 80.35% compared to 67.68% of Uttar Pradesh. Male literacy stands at 89.77% and the female literacy rate is 68.88%.

Administration
As per the Constitution of India and Panchyati Raj Act, Baghirua village is administrated by Sarpanch (Head of Village).
Baghirua was one among the "Lohiya Gram" villages listed for development under Dr. Ram Manohar Lohiya Integrated Village Development Scheme taken up by Govt. of Uttar Pradesh.

References 

Villages in Mainpuri district